Lesbian, gay, bisexual, transgender and queer (LGBTQ) persons living in Lebanon may face difficulties not experienced by non-LGBT residents, although they are considerably more free than in other parts of the Arab world. Various courts have ruled that Article 534 of the Lebanese Penal Code, which prohibits having sexual relations that "contradict the laws of nature," should not be used to arrest LGBT people. Nonetheless, the law is still being used to harass and persecute LGBT people through occasional police arrests, in which detainees are sometimes subject to intrusive physical examinations.

A poll conducted by the Pew Research Center in 2007 showed that 79% of Lebanese believed that "homosexuality should be rejected by society," as opposed to 18% who believed "homosexuality should be accepted by society". Pew research polls in 2020 indicate an even greater heteronormativity among the Lebanese population, with 85% rejecting homosexuality and only 13% indicating an acceptance of homosexuality.

Legality of same-sex sexual activity
Article 534 of the Lebanese Penal Code prohibits having sexual relations that are "contradicting the laws of nature", which is punishable by up to a year in prison. As a practical matter, enforcement of the law had been varied and often occurred through occasional police arrests. In 2002, the police broke into a woman's house after her mother claimed that her daughter had stolen some money and jewellery. Upon entering the house, the police found the woman having sexual relations with another woman and charged them both with the crime of sodomy.

In 2007, Judge Mounir Suleiman called a halt to a criminal investigation of two men arrested under Article 534. He disputed that homosexuality was "contrary to the rules of nature" and noted that what was seen as "unnatural" reflected the social mores of the time.

On 11 December 2009, the Lebanon-based LGBT organization Helem launched a report that would target the legal situation of homosexuals in the Middle East and North Africa. In 2011, a Lebanese judge in Batroun ruled against the use of Article 534 to prosecute homosexuals.

In 2012, then Justice Minister Shakib Qortbawi weighed in on the use of anal examinations on men accused of same-sex conduct, issuing a statement calling for an end to this practice.

In April 2013, the Mayor of Dekwaneh, a suburb north of Beirut, ordered security forces to raid and shut down a gay-friendly nightclub. Several club-goers were arrested and forced to undress in the municipal headquarters, where they were then photographed naked. This operation was condemned by numerous gay rights activists. Lebanon's Interior Minister of the Interim Government, Marwan Charbel, supported the Mayor of Dekwaneh saying, "Lebanon is opposed to homosexuality, and according to Lebanese law it is a criminal offense."

On 11 July 2013, the Lebanese Psychiatric Society (LPS) released a statement saying that homosexuality is not a mental disorder and does not need to be treated, they said: "Homosexuality in itself does not cause any defect in judgment, stability, reliability or social and professional abilities", "The assumption that homosexuality is a result of disturbances in the family dynamic or unbalanced psychological development is based on wrong information". Also, the LPS stated that conversion therapy, seeking to "convert" gays and bisexuals into straights has no scientific background and asked health professionals to "rely only on science" when giving opinion and treatment in this matter. This made Lebanon the first Arab country to declassify homosexuality as a "disease".

From 29 November to 1 December 2013, an independent group organized TransFocus, "an independent film festival that revolves around trans* and gender-variant topics, questions, persons, and politics in Lebanon". The three-day event was non-profit, funded via online crowdsourcing, and was carried out by a "bunch of friends and local organizers" aimed to be "outside any institution, organization or collective; international or local." The event featured film screenings, a focused discussion panel, a resource collection project, and an exhibition. This marked the first Lebanese public film festival focusing on trans voices and topics.

On 28 January 2014, a court in the municipality of Jdeideh ruled out a case against a transgender woman accused of having an "unnatural" sexual relationship with a man.

In January 2017, a Lebanese judge challenged the legal basis of the arrest of men for same-sex conduct. In his ruling, Judge Maalouf referred to a penal code provision protecting freedom of expression, Article 183, which states that "an act undertaken in exercise of a right without abuse shall not be regarded as an offense." "If no harm is done, there is no crime", the judge wrote in his decision.

Despite these rulings, Article 534 of the Penal Code still stands. Georges Azzi, executive director of the Arab Foundation for Freedoms and Equality, told the Washington Blade in 2017: "Homosexuality is technically illegal in Lebanon, however the new generation of judges are less likely to apply the law and the police forces will not reinforce it." In August 2014, the Internal Security Forces Morals Protection Bureau conducted a raid on a Turkish bathhouse in Beirut, resulting in the arrest of 27 Syrians. According to a report co-produced with Helem, the stated reason for the raid was the suspected "presence of homosexual individuals". In May 2016, LGBT activists staged a sit-in, demanding Article 534 be repealed.

In March 2018, the Kataeb Party, a minor Christian party, expressed support for the decriminalisation of homosexuality and the repeal of Article 534. Local LGBT activists welcomed the support, stating that this was the first time a political party in Parliament had endorsed their cause.

In July 2018, the Penal Appeal Court of Mount Lebanon upheld a lower court ruling which acquitted nine people prosecuted over being gay. The lower court held that homosexuality was "a practice of their fundamental rights". The Appeal Court agreed and found that consensual sex between same-sex partners cannot be considered "unnatural" so long as it does not violate morality and ethics, such as "when it is seen or heard by others, or performed in a public place, or involving a minor who must be protected." Activists welcomed the ruling and called on the Government to repeal Article 534. This ruling was the fifth of its kind in Lebanon, and the first from such a high-level court.

In 2019, Military Court Judge Peter Germanos acquitted four military personnel accused of "sodomy" in a landmark ruling, clearing the group of charges of committing sexual acts "contrary to nature" and declaring that sodomy is "not punishable by law".

In June 2022, during  Pride Month, the Caretaker Minister of Interior Bassam Mawlawi ordered the Internal Security Forces and GS to "immediately take the necessary measures to prevent any type of celebration, meeting or gathering" by the LGBTQ community following pressure by religious authorities in the country, while declaring: "This phenomenon [Homosexuality] is contrary to the habits and customs of our society" and religious principles, Mawlawi said, adding that "personal freedoms cannot be invoked." A few days later, the Lebanese Psychiatric Association released a statement stressing their position on homosexuality, stating: "as psychiatrists, we would like to clarify that homosexuality cannot be considered a disease that requires treatment".

Gender identity and expression
In January 2016, the Court of Appeals of Beirut confirmed the right of a transgender man to change his official papers, granting him access to necessary treatment and privacy. Transgender people are required to undergo sex reassignment surgery in order to change their legal gender.

Blood donation
Lebanese men who have had sexual contact with another man, even once, are banned from donating blood.

LGBT social movements

Members of the LGBT Lebanese community began to publicly campaign for LGBT rights in 2002, with the creation of a political association called Hurriyyat Khassa ("Private Liberties" in English). The group focused its efforts on reforming Article 534 of the Criminal Code so that private sex acts between consenting adults would no longer be a crime. Another LGBT rights organization in Lebanon is called Helem (meaning "Dream" in Arabic). These organizations have staged public demonstrations, lectures and fundraisers for HIV/AIDS education.

In 2006, Helem celebrated the International Day Against Homophobia, Transphobia and Biphobia in Monroe Hotel Downtown in Beirut.

In August 2007, a lesbian NGO named Meem was founded to support lesbian, bisexual, transgender, queer and questioning women in Lebanon. The group offers community support, psychological counselling, an activity center, legal support, social events, and the opportunity to work on social change. Meem also hosts a Womyn House that serves as an activity and resource center in Beirut.

The inaugural Beirut Pride was planned for 21 May 2017, but LGBT activists were forced to hold a private event due to fear of violence from police and radical Islamists. In 2018, the organizer of Beirut Pride, Hadi Damien, was arrested. The Prosecutor of Beirut suspended all the scheduled events, and initiated criminal proceedings against Hadi for organizing events that "incite to debauchery".

Lebanese communities in the Diaspora (Europe, North America, Latin America, Australia) have also established visibility and presence through Helem LGBT affiliates in various cities with big Lebanese presence including Montreal (where Helem has obtained legal registration) and Paris.

Politics

For a while, only the Kataeb Party endorsed the decriminalisation of homosexuality. None of the major or minor political parties or factions publicly endorsed any of the goals of the gay rights organizations. In 2018, Kollouna Watani, which ran 66 candidates in the election endorsed the decriminalisation of homosexuality. Dozens of other candidates also called for decriminalization.

On 1 September 2020, Martine Najem Kteily, the vice president for management in the Free Patriotic Movement (FPM) said in an interview that the major christian party endorses the abolishment of the Article 534 of the Lebanese Penal Code and supports the decriminalization of homosexuality.

Freedom of speech and expression

While there were initial reports of government censorship of LGBT themes, there has been a degree of liberalization in recent years.

On 29 May 2006, Al Arabiya ran a piece in which Beirut Municipality Council member Saad-Eddine Wazzan publicly called on Prime Minister Fouad Sanyoura and Minister of Interior Ahmad Fatfat to shut down Helem. On 16 June 2006, sermons in the mosques of Beirut condemned homosexuality and pointed to the fact that Beirut has a licensed LGBT organization called Helem. The sermons also called on the Government to provide explanations. The following day, Ahmed Fatfat denied charges by Islamist clerics that the Government had approved a gay rights group. In 2017, LGBT activists organised Lebanon's first pride parade, named Beirut Pride, but were forced to cancel due to terrorist threats from Islamic radicals. The 2018 event was banned after the main organiser was arrested by police officials. The move was condemned by Human Rights Watch, which said: "The crackdown violates freedom of assembly and association and is a step backward in a country that has made progress toward respecting the rights of LGBT people."

LGBT publications
Lebanon is the first Arab country with its own gay periodical, entitled Barra ("Out" in Arabic). A trial issue was published in March 2005 with two full issues that followed in summer 2005 and spring 2006.

A Lebanese LGBT group, Helem, also has its own website including a regular online newsletter publication.

In 2009, "Bareed Mista3jil" was published by the Lebanese lesbian Feminist Collective (FC) organization in Beirut. The organization is also called Nasawiya and is a group of activists who are involved in gender justice work. Available in both English and Arabic versions, the book is a collection of 41 true and personal stories from lesbians, bisexuals, queer and questioning women and transgender persons from all over Lebanon. The book was launched in Masrah Al Madina, Beirut by the Feminist Collective and IndyAct.

Media campaigns
In May 2015, Proud Lebanon, a Lebanese non-profit organization, marked the International Day Against Homophobia, Transphobia and Biphobia (IDAHOT) by launching a media campaign. The campaign consisted of an awareness ad featuring several prominent Lebanese artists and celebrities calling on the Lebanese Government to provide equal rights to all citizens and residents regardless of sexual orientation, nationality, etc. The ad makes particular emphasis on the rights of the LGBT community to live in a society free of homophobia, since LGBT individuals may still face wide prejudice, coming mainly from conservatives or clerics.

Public opinion
A poll conducted by the Pew Research Center in 2007 showed that 79% of Lebanese believed that "homosexuality should be rejected by society", as opposed to 18% who believed "homosexuality should be accepted by society". Younger people were more likely to support acceptance, with 27% in favor, than those between 30 and 49 (17%) and those over 50 (10%).
 
In May 2015, PlanetRomeo, an LGBT social network, published its first Gay Happiness Index (GHI). Gay men from over 120 countries were asked about how they feel about society's view on homosexuality, how do they experience the way they are treated by other people and how satisfied are they with their lives. Lebanon was ranked 99th with a GHI score of 33.

According to a 2017 World Values Survey, 48% said they would not accept a homosexual neighbour, while 52% of Lebanese respondents said they would not mind if they had a homosexual neighbour, making Lebanon the highest-ranking Arab country surveyed and the second-highest-ranking Muslim-majority country after Pakistan.

According to a 2019 survey conducted by the Arab Barometer, 8% of respondents considered honour killings acceptable, compared to 6% who accepted homosexuality. Another 2019 survey found that 32% of Lebanese between 15 and 80 years had severe homophobic attitudes, with more tolerance correlated with knowing someone gay, university education, high monthly income, and higher problem-focused engagement.

Summary table

Notable LGBT people from Lebanon 

Etel Adnan (1925–2021), poet, essayist, and visual artist
Rabih Alameddine (born 1959), painter and writer
Dayna Ash, Cultural and LGBT rights activist 
Georges Azzi (born 1979), activist and co-founder of Helem
Simone Fattal (born 1942), artist
Peter Macdissi (born 1974), actor and executive producer
Sandra Melhem, LGBT rights activist
Mika (born 1983), singer-songwriter
Hamed Sinno (born 1988), singer
Haaz Sleiman (born 1976), actor

See also

Human rights in Lebanon
LGBT rights in Asia
LGBT rights in the Middle East

Notes

References

External links
 Helem official website 
 
 

 
Human rights in Lebanon
Law of Lebanon